Dead Cert is Dick Francis's first novel, published in 1962. Featured in the 2007 book 100 Must-Read Crime Novels. It was filmed by Tony Richardson in 1974, and Vasile Breşcanu  in 1976.

The title is a shortened form of "It's a dead certainty," in this case a play on words referring to the fact that the steeplechase horse Admiral should have won, but his jockey died.

Synopsis

Admiral should have won his race at Maidenhead, but an unexpected fall and the death of top jockey Bill Davidson gave jockey Alan York and his mount the win instead. But Alan recognized sabotage when he saw it and was not about to let a murderous act go unpunished, even if it meant risking his own life to bring his friend's killers to justice.

Critical reception
The Guardian obituary of Francis read, "Right from the start, with Dead Cert in 1962, the Dick Francis thriller showed a mastery of lean, witty genre prose reminiscent—sometimes to the point of comic parody—of Raymond Chandler and Dashiell Hammett. It was an American style that many clever people in England had attempted to reproduce without much success, and it was a wonder how a barely educated former jump jockey was able to do the trick with such effortless ease."

The New York Times added,

A chance encounter with a literary agent led to his writing The Sport of Queens, published the year after he retired. Emboldened by its success (and further motivated by his paltry wages as a journalist), he began writing Dead Cert.

Drawing on his experiences as a jockey and his intimate knowledge of the racetrack crowd—from aristocratic owners to Cockney stable boys—the novel contained all the elements that readers would come to relish from a Dick Francis thriller. There was the pounding excitement of a race, the aura of the gentry at play, the sweaty smells from the stables out back, an appreciation for the regal beauty and unique personality of a thoroughbred—and enough sadistic violence to man and beast to satisfy the bloodthirsty.

Fred Glueckstein, in Of Men, Women and Horses, wrote, "During the course of York's adventures, one can identify in Francis's work the elements that would precede his future success: a lone hero fighting villains with honor, courage, and determination; skilled plotting; action and suspense, and classic scenes of equestrian fiction."

Dead Cert is included in the "fiction core list" in Carol Alabaster's book Developing an Outstanding Core Collection: A Guide for Libraries by Carol Alabaster (2002).

References

1962 British novels
Novels by Dick Francis
British novels adapted into films
Horse racing novels
Novels set in Berkshire
British sports novels
British crime novels
1962 debut novels
Michael Joseph books